Route 411, also known as Purbeck's Cove Road, is a  east–west highway on the Baie Verte Peninsula of Newfoundland in the Canadian province of Newfoundland and Labrador. It connects the town of Westport, along with the community of Purbeck's Cove, with Route 410 (Dorset Trail), serving as the only road access to these aforementioned settlements.

Route description

Route 411 begins at a fork in the road along the coast of White Bay in downtown Westport. It heads northeast to have an intersection with a short, narrow, winding gravel road that leads to Purbeck's Cove further to the south. The highway now leaves town and winds its way east through rural areas for several kilometres,  where it passes through Western Arm and has an intersection with a local road leading to Bear Cove, before coming to an end at an intersection with Route 410 between Sheppardville and Baie Verte, just north of Flatwater Pond Park.

Major intersections

References

411